is a Japanese enka singer.

Miyama's voice gives people a sense of security and vitality ανδ is called .

Discography

Studio albums

Compilation albums

Cover albums

Singles

Videography

Filmography

Television

NHK Kōhaku Uta Gassen appearances

Radio

Bibliography

References

External links

 
 

Enka singers
Musicians from Kōchi Prefecture
1980 births
Living people
21st-century Japanese singers
21st-century Japanese male singers